Xeroplexa is a genus of small, air-breathing land snails, terrestrial pulmonate gastropod mollusks in the subfamily Helicellinae  of the family Geomitridae, the hairy snails and their allies.  

Xeroplexa species were within genus Candidula until a molecular phylogeny revealed the polyphyly of Candidula, and the genus Xeroplexa Monterosato, 1892 was recovered.

Distribution
The genus is mainly distributed along western Iberian Peninsula, although X. intersecta spreads from northern Iberian Peninsula to central Europe and British Islands.

Species 
Species within the genus Xeroplexa include:
 Xeroplexa arrabidensis (Holyoak & Holyoak, 2014)
 Xeroplexa belemensis (Servain, 1880)
 Xeroplexa carrapateirensis (Holyoak & Holyoak, 2014)
 Xeroplexa coudensis (Holyoak & Holyoak, 2010)
 Xeroplexa intersecta (Poiret, 1801)
 Xeroplexa olisippensis (Servain, 1880)
 Xeroplexa ponsulensis (Holyoak & Holyoak, 2014)
 Xeroplexa scabiosula (Locard, 1899)
 Xeroplexa setubalensis (Pfeiffer, 1850) type species
Xeroplexa strucki (Maltzan, 1886)

References 

 Kobelt, W. (1892). Literaturbericht. Nachrichtsblatt der Deutschen Malakozoologischen Gesellschaft, 24 (7/8): 149-152. Frankfurt am Main
 Bank, R. A. (2017). Classification of the Recent terrestrial Gastropoda of the World. Last update: July 16th, 2017

External links
 http://luisjavierchueca.com/research-3/candidula-s-l/

 
Geomitridae